Padomju Latvijas Komunists ('Communist of Soviet Latvia') was a Latvian language monthly journal published from Riga, the theoretical organ of the Central Committee of the Communist Party of Latvia. It had a Russian language edition, called Kommunist Sovetskoi Latvii.

The publication was founded in 1945, and called Padomju Latvijas Boļševiks ('Bolshevik of Soviet Latvia') until 1952. In the early years Jānis Bumbiers was the editor of the journal. As of the early 1970s, Padomju Latvijas Komunists had a circulation of 16,300, and Kommunist Sovetskoi Latvii had a circulation of 5,100. It ceased publication in 1990.

References

External links
 WorldCat record

Defunct magazines published in Latvia
Defunct political magazines
Eastern Bloc mass media
Magazines established in 1945
Magazines disestablished in 1990
Magazines published in the Soviet Union
Marxist magazines
Mass media in Riga
Monthly magazines